

The Blériot 135 (or Bl-135) was a French airliner of the 1920s, a development of the Blériot 115 with more powerful, radial engines. One of the two built was a converted 115, the other new. Both served with Air Union on their Paris–London route from mid-1924.

Variants
Bleriot 135
Four-engined airliner.
Bleriot 136
Projected five-seat day-bomber version. Not built.

Operators
France
Air Union

Specifications

References
 
 Barfoot, John. "R.E.8 Pilot: Lieutenant William Lefevre Oxley Parker13 Squadron, RFC." The '14–'18 Journal 2006. Sydney: The Australian Society of World War 1 Aero Historians, 14.
 aviafrance.com

135
1920s French airliners
Four-engined tractor aircraft
Aircraft first flown in 1924
Four-engined piston aircraft